Mayfield Heights is a city in Cuyahoga County, Ohio, United States, and is an east-side suburb of Cleveland. The population was 18,827 at the 2010 census.

History
Mayfield Heights was initially built up as a streetcar suburb of Cleveland. It was incorporated as a village in 1925 and as a city in 1951.  The city derives its name from Mayfield Township, now defunct.  One location in the city, the W.A. Thorp House, was listed on the National Register of Historic Places in 1978.

The city has a large community of Italian Americans, including newly-arrived immigrants and those who migrated eastward along Mayfield Road from Little Italy on Cleveland's East Side.  Since the dissolution of the USSR in 1991, they have been joined by a significant number of immigrants from Russia and other former Soviet republics.

Geography

Demographics

23.9% were of Italian, 14.5% German, 11.9% Irish, 7.4% Polish, 6.8% Russian, and 6.4% English ancestries.

Languages
81.0% spoke English, 7.11% Russian, 4.10% Italian, and 1.03% Arabic as their first language.

2010 census
As of the census of 2010, there were 19,155 people, 9,662 households, and 4,884 families living in the city. The racial makeup of the city was 80.4% White, 10.3% African American, 0.1% Native American, 7.0% Asian, 0.5% from other races, and 1.7% from two or more races. Hispanic or Latino people of any race were 2.0% of the population.

There were 9,662 households, of which 21.2% had children under the age of 18 living with them, 36.0% were married couples living together, 11.2% had a female householder with no husband present, 3.3% had a male householder with no wife present, and 49.5% were non-families. 44.2% of all households were made up of individuals, and 20.5% had someone living alone who was 65 years of age or older. The average household size was 1.97 and the average family size was 2.75.

The median age in the city was 42.9 years. 17.6% of residents were under the age of 18; 7.2% were between the ages of 18 and 24; 27.6% were from 25 to 44; 23.9% were from 45 to 64; and 23.8% were 65 years of age or older. The gender makeup of the city was 45.3% male and 54.7% female.

Of the city's population over the age of 25, 38.3% hold a bachelor's degree or higher.

2000 census
As of the census of 2000, there were 19,386 people, 9,848 households, and 5,042 families living in the city. The population density was 4,596.1 people per square mile (1,773.7/km2). There were 10,461 housing units at an average density of 2,480.1 per square mile (957.1/km2). The racial makeup of the city was 91.85% White, 2.98% African American, 0.03% Native American, 4.03% Asian, 0.01% Pacific Islander, 0.18% from other races, and 0.93% from two or more races. Hispanic or Latino people of any race were 1.04% of the population.

There were 9,848 households, out of which 17.9% had children under the age of 18 living with them, 40.1% were married couples living together, 8.2% had a female householder with no husband present, and 48.8% were non-families. 44.5% of all households were made up of individuals, and 22.5% had someone living alone who was 65 years of age or older. The average household size was 1.95 and the average family size was 2.75.

In the city the population was spread out, with 16.1% under the age of 18, 6.6% from 18 to 24, 28.9% from 25 to 44, 20.8% from 45 to 64, and 27.6% who were 65 years of age or older. The median age was 44 years. For every 100 females, there were 82.2 males. For every 100 females age 18 and over, there were 78.9 males.

The median income for a household in the city was $37,236, and the median income for a family was $51,132. Males had a median income of $37,358 versus $29,118 for females. The per capita income for the city was $24,392. About 4.6% of families and 6.3% of the population were below the poverty line, including 6.3% of those under age 18 and 9.1% of those age 65 or over.

Schools

Mayfield Heights is a part of the Mayfield City School District, along with Highland Heights, Mayfield Village, and Gates Mills.

Notable people
Matt Prater, NFL player
Lauren Underwood, U.S. representative

Surrounding communities

References

External links

 City website

 
Cities in Ohio
Cities in Cuyahoga County, Ohio
Populated places established in 1920
Russian-American culture in Ohio
Italian-American culture in Ohio
Ukrainian communities in the United States
Cleveland metropolitan area
1920 establishments in Ohio